Kishwaukee may refer to:

Kishwaukee, Illinois
Kishwaukee College
Kishwaukee River
USS Kishwaukee (AOG-9)